"Engel" (German for "Angel" or "Angels") is a song by German industrial metal band Rammstein. It was released in April 1997 as the first single from their second album, Sehnsucht. The female part of song's chorus is sung by Christiane "Bobo" Hebold of the German pop band Bobo in White Wooden Houses. An English version of "Engel" can be found on US special editions of Sehnsucht.
According to an interview, keyboardist Christian Lorenz came up with the main riff for this song on a synthesizer along with a whistle melody.

Music video
While Lindemann, Schneider and Flake are in the audience, Paul Landers can be seen taking Schneider's place by playing the drums and Kruspe and Riedel are seen singing. The video references the 1996 film, From Dusk till Dawn.

Live performances
A regular during the Sehnsucht tour, it was used as the last song of the main set in non-festival concerts. In the first months of the Mutter (2001) tour, "Engel" appeared in the setlists sporadically, but became a regular again in November, and continued as the last song of the main set until the end of the tour.

When performed on stage, flames were shot into the air, and Schneider's drumsticks would shoot sparks. In the "Live aus Berlin" shows, Bobo joined Rammstein to sing her parts from inside a flaming cage, instead of the usual pre-recorded chorus used in most of the shows. Having been excluded in the entire Reise, Reise tour, "Engel" returned to the setlists as the closing song of the Liebe ist für alle da tour, taking place during 2009 and 2011. This time around, vocalist Till Lindemann sang the chorus instead of Bobo's pre-recorded lines. For the pyrotechnics, Lindemann wears a set of angel wings that shoot flames from the tips and have sparks go off along them. "Engel" was the penultimate song on the setlist during the Made in Germany 1995-2011 tour, and the tour in 2016.

In other media
The song was used during the end credits of the 1997 film, Mortal Kombat: Annihilation, and also appears on its soundtrack.

Track listings

Single
 Engel - 4:23
 Sehnsucht - 4:02
 Rammstein (Eskimos & Egypt Radio Edit) - 3:40
 Rammstein (Eskimos & Egypt Instrumental Edit) - 3:32
 Rammstein - 4:25

Fan-Edition
A second single called Engel (Fan-Edition) was released on 23 May 1997. It includes different track listing from the original and a different artwork, showing singer Till Lindemann.
 Engel (Extended Version) - 4:34
 Feuerräder (Live Demo Version 1994) - 4:47
 Wilder Wein (Demo Version 1994) - 5:41
 Rammstein (Eskimos & Egypt Instrumental) - 3:27

Charts

Weekly charts

Year-end charts

Certifications

References

Rammstein songs
1997 singles
Electronic rock songs
Songs written by Richard Z. Kruspe
Songs written by Paul Landers
Songs written by Till Lindemann
Songs written by Christian Lorenz
Songs written by Oliver Riedel
Songs written by Christoph Schneider
1997 songs